Loxostege ephippialis is a species of moth in the family Crambidae. It was described by Johan Wilhelm Zetterstedt in 1839. It is found in Norway, Sweden, Finland, Russia and North America (from Labrador west to the Northwest Territories and the Rocky Mountains and south to Wyoming and Colorado).

The ground colour of the wings is bluish gray. Adults are on wing from June to mid July in both North America and Europe.

References

Moths of Europe
Moths of North America
Moths described in 1839
Pyraustinae
Taxa named by Johan Wilhelm Zetterstedt